Peperomia velutina is a species of flowering plant in the family Piperaceae, native to Colombia and Ecuador. It has gained the Royal Horticultural Society's Award of Garden Merit as a terrarium or greenhouse ornamental.

Subtaxa
The following varieties are accepted:
Peperomia velutina var. lanceolata C.DC. – Colombia
Peperomia velutina var. velutina – Ecuador

References

velutina
Flora of Colombia
Flora of Ecuador
Plants described in 1872